The Alpha Ace is an electric subcompact 2-door coupe to be produced by American electric vehicle company Alpha Motor Corporation in 2023.

Overview
The Alpha Ace was revealed as a 3D rendering online on December 23, 2020, planned to be launched by the end of 2023. In February 2021, Alpha revealed the Ace Performance, which is a sport variant of the Ace, alongside the Ace-based Jax crossover.

In November 2021, Alpha Motor Corporation introduced the Adventure Series, a special edition line available for both the Ace and Jax, in partnership with KC HiLiTES and KMC Wheels. The Adventure Series package adds new off-road lights, tires, and wheels.

Specifications

References

Coupés
Upcoming car models